In law, provocation is when a person is considered to have committed a criminal act partly because of a preceding set of events that might cause a reasonable individual to lose self control. This makes them less morally culpable than if the act was premeditated (pre-planned) and done out of pure malice (malice aforethought). It "affects the quality of the actor's state of mind as an indicator of moral blameworthiness."

Provocation is often a mitigating factor in sentencing. It rarely serves as a legal defense, meaning it does not stop the defendant from being guilty of the crime. It may however, lead to a lesser punishment. In some common law legal systems, provocation is a "partial defense" for murder charges, which can result in the offense being classified as the lesser offense of manslaughter, specifically voluntary manslaughter.

Provocation is distinct from self-defense in that self-defense is a legal defense, and refers to a justifiable action to protect oneself from imminent violence.

Definition
If a crime is caused by provocation, it is said to be committed in the heat of passion, under an irresistible urge incited by the provoking events, and without being entirely determined by reason. "'Malice aforethought' implies a mind under the sway of reason, whereas 'passion' whilst it does not imply a dethronement of reason, is the furor brevis, which renders a man deaf to the voice of reason so that, although the act was intentional to death, it was not the result of malignity of heart, but imputable to human infirmity. Passion and malice are, therefore, inconsistent motive powers, and hence an act which proceeds from the one, cannot also proceed from the other." (Hannah v. Commonwealth, Supreme Court of Virginia 1929) Establishing Provocation can reduce a murder charge to a voluntary manslaughter charge.

Provocation may be defined by statutory law, by common law, or some combination. It is a possible defense for the person provoked, or a possible criminal act by the one who caused the provocation. It may be a defense by excuse or exculpation alleging a sudden or temporary loss of control (a permanent loss of control is regarded as insanity) as a response to another's provocative conduct sufficient to justify an acquittal, a mitigated sentence or a conviction for a lesser charge. Provocation can be a relevant factor in a court's assessment of a defendant's mens rea, intention, or state of mind, at the time of an act which the defendant is accused of.

In common law, provocation is established by establishing events that would be "adequate" to create a heat of passion in a reasonable person, and by establishing that the heat of passion was created in the accused.

History
The defense of provocation was first developed in English courts in the 16th and 17th centuries. During that period, a conviction of murder carried a mandatory death sentence. This inspired the need for a lesser offense. At that time, not only was it acceptable, but was socially required that a man respond with controlled violence if his honor or dignity were insulted or threatened. It was therefore considered understandable that sometimes the violence might be excessive and end with a killing.

During the 19th century, as social norms began changing, the idea that it was desirable for dignified men to respond with violence when they were insulted or ridiculed began losing traction and was replaced with the view that while those responses may not be ideal, that they were a normal human reaction resulting from a loss of self-control, and, as such, they deserved to be considered as a mitigating circumstance.

During the end of the 20th century and the beginning of the 21st century, the defense of provocation, and the situations in which it should apply, have led to significant controversies, with many condemning the concept as an anachronism, arguing that it contradicts contemporary social norms where people are expected to control their behavior, even when angry.

Present day
Today, the use of provocation as a legal defense is generally controversial, because it appears to enable defendants to receive more lenient treatment because they allowed themselves to be provoked. Judging whether an individual should be held responsible for their actions depends on an assessment of their culpability. This is usually tested by reference to a reasonable person: that is, a universal standard to determine whether an ordinary person would have been provoked and, if so, would have done as the defendant did; if the predominant view of social behavior would be that, when provoked, it would be acceptable to respond verbally and, if the provocation persists, to walk away, that will set the threshold for the defense. Furor brevis or "heat of passion", is the term used in criminal law to describe the emotional state of mind following a provocation, in which acts are considered to be at least partially caused by loss of self-control, so the acts are not entirely governed by reason or expressed "[It's the heat of passion] which renders a man deaf to the voice of reason". In common law, "passion usually means rage, but it also
includes fear or any violent and intense emotion sufficient to dethrone reason".

Another controversial factor of this defense, especially in UK law, is that the provoked must have carried out their act immediately after the provocation occurred, otherwise known as a "sudden loss of self control", with the controversy surrounding the definition of "sudden". This argument on the grounds of time still occurs and has caused many defendants, particularly women, to lose their cases on this ground, as they will often wait (in wife-battering cases) until the husband is asleep, as shown in R v Ahluwalia 1992. This led to the enactment of a new defense of "loss of control" (see Dennis J. Baker, Glanville Williams Textbook of Criminal Law, (London: Sweet & Maxwell, 2012) at Chapter 22.) The new defense removed the "sudden" requirement, as it wanted to cover battered women who lose control over a long period, but, as Baker Ibid points out, it will probably not succeed in achieving that aim.  The new loss of control defense found in ss. 54-55 Coroners and Justice Act 2009 also removed sexual infidelity as a qualifying form of provocation, but in a recent controversial decision by Lord Judge in R v Clinton [2012] 1 Cr App R 26 in the Court of Appeal, Lord Judge interpreted the new offense as allowing for sexual infidelity to count under the third prong of the new defense (see Baker & Zhao 2012). R v Clinton  [2012] 1 Cr App R 26 has received heavy criticism from academics, see Baker & Zhao, "Contributory Qualifying and Non-Qualifying Triggers in the Loss of Control Defence: A Wrong Turn on Sexual Infidelity," Journal of Criminal Law, Vol. 76, pp. 254, 2012, available at SSRN:

As a partial defense for murder
In some common law jurisdictions such as the UK, Canada, and several Australian states, the defense of provocation is only available against a charge of murder and only acts to reduce the conviction to manslaughter. This is known as "voluntary manslaughter", which is considered more serious than "involuntary manslaughter", and comprises both manslaughter by "unlawful act" and manslaughter by criminal negligence. In the United States, the Model Penal Code substitutes the broader standard of extreme emotional or mental distress for the comparatively narrower standard of provocation. Criminal law in the United States, however, falls mostly within the jurisdiction of the individual states, and not all states have adopted the Model Penal Code. Under the United States Sentencing Guidelines for federal courts, "If the victim's wrongful conduct contributed significantly to provoking the offense behavior, the court may reduce the sentence below the guideline range to reflect the nature and circumstances of the offense."

Provocation as a partial defence for murder came into spotlight in New Zealand during 2009 following the trial of 33-year-old university tutor Clayton Weatherston, with calls for its abolition except during sentencing. On 9 January 2008, Weatherston stabbed to death university student and girlfriend Sophie Elliott in her Dunedin home. During his trial, Weatherston used provocation as a defense to murder and claimed it was manslaughter. He was found guilty of murder and sentenced to life imprisonment with a 17 years non-parole period. In response, the New Zealand Parliament introduced the Crimes (Provocation Repeal) Amendment Bill, which repealed Sections 169 and 170 of the Crimes Act 1961 and therefore abolishing the partial defense of provocation. The bill passed its third reading 116–5, with only ACT New Zealand opposing the bill, and became law effective 8 December 2009. Although the defense was removed, it could still be used for cases prior to 2009. In May 2010 Moliga Tatupu-Tinoa'i was convicted of murdering his wife at a service station in Wellington. Mr Tatupu-Tinoa'i's lawyer Mike Antunovic  unsuccessfully attempted to use the partial defense of provocation.

In 2015, Canada reformed the provocation defense restricting its use. Article 232(2) of the Criminal Code states that provocation is: "Conduct of the victim that would constitute an indictable offense under this Act that is punishable by five or more years of imprisonment and that is of such a nature as to be sufficient to deprive an ordinary person of the power of self-control is provocation for the purposes of this section, if the accused acted on it on the sudden and before there was time for their passion to cool." Prior to the amendment, the law required only that the provoking act be a "wrongful act or insult", not a serious indictable offence.

In Australia, Tasmania became the first state to abolish the partial defence of provocation in case of murder which acted by converting what would otherwise have been murder into manslaughter. The next state to abolish it was Victoria, in 2005, however it was replaced by a new defensive homicide law. The 2005 defensive homicide laws were subsequently repealed in 2014. Western Australia abolished the partial defence of provocation in 2008.  The ACT and the Northern Territory amended the law in 2004 and 2006 respectively to exclude a non-violent sexual advance as a sufficient basis for a defence of provocation in itself; such conduct must be taken into account with other conduct of the deceased to determine whether the defence has been established. By contrast in New South Wales, the law of provocation was amended in 2014 to assert that a non-violent sexual advance to the accused does not constitute extreme provocation. The new provocation law of New South Wales was amended to the defence of extreme provocation; the provocative conduct of the deceased must also have constituted a serious indictable offence, and the loss of self-control test must be measured by the objective test of the "ordinary person". It was also made clear in the amendments that the conduct of the deceased may constitute extreme provocation, even if the conduct did not occur immediately before the act causing death. This was done in order to provide protection for victims of long-term abuse, or "slow burn" situations. In Queensland the partial defence of provocation in section 304(1) of the Criminal Code was amended in 2011, in order to "reduce the scope of the defence being available to those who kill out of sexual possessiveness or
jealousy". South Australia abolished provocation in 2020.

In cases of assault and battery

In the United States, provocation is rarely accepted as a complete defense, but state courts have ruled that it is still a mitigating factor in matters of assault and/or battery where the sentence can be reduced or the crime lowered to a lesser charge.
In extremely rare cases, adequate provocation has resulted in the defendant never being charged with a crime.  In one famous example, prosecutors in California refused to charge astronaut Buzz Aldrin with assault after he punched conspiracy theorist Bart Sibrel in the face for aggressively confronting him and calling him "a coward, and a liar, and a thief."

In England and Wales, provocation is similarly considered a partial defense and only reduces the penalty.  Ironically, English law considers the act of intentionally provoking another person to be crime in and of itself under the charge of Fear or provocation of violence.

Controversy

General concerns
The concept of provocation is controversial, and there are many debates related to it. Critics bring several arguments against it, such as:
people in contemporary society are expected to control their behavior, even when angry, and to not act on any impulse they may have
provocation creates a culture of blaming the victim
what is considered provocation is subjective
provocation laws are very difficult to enforce since, in cases involving murder, the victim is dead and cannot present their version of facts

Selective use of the laws
Some people accept provocation as a valid legal concept, but express serious concerns about the context in which it is used. Data from Australia shows that the partial defense of provocation that converts murder into manslaughter has been used successfully primarily in two circumstances: sexual infidelity where a male kills his female partner or her lover; and non-violent homosexual advances.

Feminist groups and LGBT groups have been highly critical of this situation. They argue that this legitimizes or trivializes male violence against women; undermines campaigns that seek to stop violence against women; reinforces the view of women as men's property; and maintains and justifies homophobia and discrimination against gays.

Objective vs subjective test
There has been controversy on whether the objective or the subjective standard should be used when deciding on whether the behavior of the victim has constituted sufficient provocation. The objective 'ordinary person' test has been criticised for ignoring characteristics such as ethnicity and culture which affect a person's capacity to lose self-control, whereas the subjective standard that focuses on ones' personal and cultural background has been criticized for opening the door for mitigation in cases of honor killings, homophobic or racist violence and bringing in justifications for crimes that may be acceptable in the family and subculture of the accused but are rejected by wider society. A compromise can be a combination of objective and subjective analysis, as was ruled in 2020 by the Supreme Court of Ireland (replacing what was considered to be a purely subjective test that was in existence since the 1970s).

References

External links
 Reid Griffith Fontaine, Adequate (Non)Provocation and Heat of Passion as Excuse Not Justification, University of Michigan Journal of Law Reform, 2008.
 Reid Griffith Fontaine, The Wrongfulness of Wrongly Interpreting Wrongfulness: Provocation Interpretational Bias and Heat of Passion Homicide, New Criminal Law Review
New Zealand Law Commission: The Partial Defence of Provocation: Wellington: New Zealand Law Commission: 2007:

See also 
Fighting words
Gay panic defense
Imperfect self-defense
Self control theory in crime

Manslaughter in English law

Criminal defenses
Criminal law